Old Sow is the largest tidal whirlpool in the Western Hemisphere, located off the southwestern shore of Deer Island, New Brunswick, Canada, and off the northeast shore of Moose Island, the principal island of Eastport, Maine.

Origin
The whirlpool is caused by local bathymetry and a  tidal range where waters exchange between Passamaquoddy Bay and the Bay of Fundy, combined with the topography of the location's sea floor at the confluence of the numerous local currents through channels and over small sea mounts.

The photograph was calibrated using the Deer Island Point Light beacon tower of known width that was included in the photograph.

Old Sow is one of five significant whirlpools worldwide (Corryvreckan, Scotland; Saltstraumen, Norway; Moskstraumen, Norway; and the Naruto whirlpools, Japan are the others). Although the tidal currents within Western Passage surrounding Old Sow compare with faster whirlpools elsewhere, the speed of Old Sow's vortex is considerably slower than the Moskstraumen, the world's most powerful whirlpool.

Tremendous water turbulence occurs locally in the greater Old Sow area, but it does not usually constitute a navigation hazard for motorized vessels with experienced operators at the helm; however, small craft—especially vessels with keels (sailboats) and human-powered vessels—are warned to avoid these waters when the tide is running.

The failed Passamaquoddy Tidal Power Project/"Quoddy Dam" Project saw a series of tidal dikes constructed during the 1930s to connect Moose Island (Eastport, Maine) to Carlow Island (in Eastport), Carlow Island to Pleasant Point and to connect Treat Island (in Eastport) to Dudley Island (in Lubec, Maine). The changes in local water flow from the dikes reportedly reduced predictability of the "funnel" effect of Old Sow.

References

External links
Old Sow Whirlpool
Old Sow Whirlpool Survivors Association
Old Sow Whirlpool Bay of Fundy

Bodies of water of New Brunswick
Whirlpools
Landforms of Charlotte County, New Brunswick
Eastport, Maine
Bodies of water of Washington County, Maine